Fenegrò is a comune (municipality) in the Province of Como in the Italian region Lombardy, located about  northwest of Milan and about  southwest of Como. As of 1 January 2022, it had a population of 3,211 and an area of 5.4 km².

Fenegrò borders the following municipalities: Cirimido, Guanzate, Limido Comasco, Lurago Marinone, Turate, Veniano.

Demographic evolution

References

External links
 www.comune.fenegro.co.it

Cities and towns in Lombardy